Operation Hardtack I was a series of 35 nuclear tests conducted by the United States from April 28 to August 18 in 1958 at the Pacific Proving Grounds. At the time of testing, the Operation Hardtack I test series included more nuclear detonations than the total of prior nuclear explosions in the Pacific Ocean. These tests followed the Project 58/58A series, which occurred from 1957 December 6 to 1958, March 14, and preceded the Operation Argus series, which took place in 1958 from August 27 to September 6.

Operation Hardtack I was directed by Joint Task Force 7 (JTF 7). JTF-7 was a collaboration between the military and many civilians, but was structured like a military organization. Its 19,100 personnel were composed of members of the US military, federal civilian employees, as well as workers affiliated with the Department of Defense (DOD) and the Atomic Energy Commission (AEC).

There were three main research directions. The first was the development of new types of nuclear weapons. This was undertaken by detonating experimental devices created by the AEC's Los Alamos Scientific Laboratory and the University of California Radiation Laboratory (UCRL). The DOD performed experiments and tests on these detonations that did not hamper the AEC's research. The second research direction was to examine how underwater explosions affected material, especially Navy ships, and was performed by the DOD. The Wahoo test was conducted in the open ocean, whereas Umbrella was in a lagoon. The final avenue of study was to analyze high-altitude nuclear tests to refine the detection of high-altitude nuclear tests and investigate defensive practices for combatting ballistic missiles. This research direction was composed of three individual tests and were the first high-altitude tests. The individual tests in the series were Orange, Teak, and Yucca. Orange and Teak were known collectively as Operation Newsreel and were rocket boosted. Yucca reached its altitude utilizing balloons.

Historical background
Many events and proceedings leading up to Operation Hardtack I, such as previous nuclear testing results and the global political atmosphere, influenced its creation and design. One such historical circumstance was that nuclear radiation concerns were mounting publicly and abroad by 1956. During the 1956 Presidential Election, ending nuclear testing was a campaign issue and nuclear safety was one part of that discussion. At the same time, the Union of Soviet Socialist Republics (USSR) was publicly proposing a moratorium on testing.

In 1956 during June, the National Academy of Sciences (NAS) recommended new radiation exposure limits for the general public in a report entitled: "The Biological Effects of Atomic Radiation". The AEC, which was the body that developed nuclear weapons, accepted the NAS recommended radiation exposure limits. Some AEC members asserted that the limits were reached incorrectly and should be reviewed in the future. Charles L. Dunham, AEC Director of the Division of Biology and Medicine (DBM), said that the new limits of nuclear radiation exposure would prevent them from continuing testing in Nevada. Dunham, in association with other AEC offices and officials, made recommendations to move further tests to the Pacific to eliminate the need to determine radiological fallout safety.

Also in 1956, the AEC was designing a test series that included nuclear detonations which would release significant amounts of nuclear fallout. The series came to be known as Operation Plumbbob and took place in 1957 from April 24 to October 7. Operation Plumbbob was followed by Project 58/58A and Operation Hardtack I. At the time of testing, Operation Plumbbob was the most extensive nuclear test series held at the Nevada Test Site. President Eisenhower was very cautious in approving Plumbbob due to public concern. Consequently, the AEC held brief and ultimately fruitless discussions of moving some of the tests in the Plumbbob series to the next planned Pacific Ocean series, Operation Hardtack I, to minimize radioactive fallout in and around the Nevada Test Site.

When Operation Plumbbob began in the spring of 1957, the planning process of Operation Hardtack I was well underway and the number of nuclear detonations planned were more than those in the Plumbbob series. At the same time, radiation and nuclear proliferation concerns around the world had led to formal discussions between the US, USSR, and other countries on the topic of instituting a global ban on nuclear testing as a path to disarmament. In 1957 on August 9 AEC chairman Lewis L. Strauss proposed to President Eisenhower a preliminary plan of Operation Hardtack I. President Eisenhower objected to the length of the four-month testing period and that the plan called for 25 shots, which was one more than in Plumbbob.

Project 58/58A followed Operation Plumbbob and began almost two months later starting in 1957 on December 6. Project 58/58A was composed of four safety tests; they were not supposed to result in nuclear radiation. All four took place at the Nevada Test Site. The safety tests were intended to ensure that the bombs would not malfunction. However, the test named Coulomb-C which took place in 1957 on December 9 did malfunction. It resulted in an unanticipated  blast. The blast released a nuclear radiation fallout cloud that traveled toward Los Angeles and resulted in low levels of nuclear radiation. The bomb failure added to public concern over nuclear testing's safety.

Some tests were cut in an effort to meet Eisenhower's demands for a shorter testing period, but new tests quickly filled their place. AEC chairman Strauss remarked that the large number of shots was due to the "DOD's requirement for an increasing number of different nuclear weapons types". Eisenhower eventually approved the plan for Operation Hardtack I in late January, even though it still contained 25 shots. On March 31, 1958, the USSR announced a suspension of all tests and called on the US to do the same. On May 9 the leader of the Soviet Union, Nikita Khrushchev, accepted Eisenhower's invitation for technical discussions on a nuclear testing moratorium and negotiations began on July 1 of the same year. Eisenhower announced to the US on August 22, 1958, that the ban would begin October 31. US scientists responded by seeking to add more tests to the Hardtack Series in case it turned out to be the last chance. Consequently, Operation Hardtack I consisted of 35 tests.

The high-altitude nuclear tests delivered the first openly reported man-made high-altitude electromagnetic pulses (EMP). Most radio communications immediately dropped across the Pacific Ocean. The blackout in Australia lasted for 9 hours and Hawaii's lasted for no less than 2 hours.

High-altitude tests 

Operation Hardtack I contained three high-altitude tests called Operation Newsreel that were designed to study many effects that a nuclear explosion would have on materials and electronic systems. They were also used to test the energy of the explosion and what forms of energy they would produce. Yucca was the name of the first high-altitude test and it was performed near the Enewetak Atoll in the Marshall Islands.

Impact on ozone layer 
There was some uncertainty on whether detonating a nuclear weapon at such high altitudes would cause a hole in the ozone layer. After multiple underwater tests there was evidence to show the energy created by the blast would create ozone. Project leads determined some destruction of ozone would occur which would then be replaced by the ozone created from the explosion. It was agreed that if this theory were wrong, the hole created in the ozone layer would be minuscule enough to cause no harm. Upon completion of Operation Newsreel, it was determined that there was very little evidence of any harm being caused to the natural ozone layer.

Yucca 
Yucca was the first high-altitude test performed during Operation Hardtack I and was detonated on April 28, 1958. Due to issues with high winds on Enewetak Island, the balloon launches from ground were unsatisfactory, thus creating the need for a new method. The balloons were then deployed from an aircraft carrier which helped with deployment and the inflation. While the balloons were inflated, they were unable to take too much force from wind or the plastic material of the balloons would tear. While the balloons were inflating on the aircraft carrier, the ship could match and oppose the wind speed allowing for the balloon to be inflated in still air. To make sure the launch would be successful 86 balloon launches were tested.

Due to concerns of failures, many safety measures were employed. While on ground, the bomb used multiple pins to prevent certain safety features of the bomb from being deployed before liftoff. One such pin was used to stop the electrical systems so that the bomb would be unable to be armed. In case of a dud, the bomb would detach from the balloon and be allowed to drop into the ocean where many more safety features would come into action. Some of these features included probes which could detect saltwater which would destroy the electrical system so the conductive seawater could not cause a short which would detonate the bomb. Another concern was a nuclear device floating in the ocean should a misfire occur. To combat this, inserts were created which would dissolve in a few hours, thus scuttling the device.

On the day of the launch many meteorological aspects were taken into account and calculations were done to ensure the bomb would reach the correct altitude. The bomb was loaded onto an aircraft carrier and preparations began. As the balloon was inflated multiple testing devices were connected to the balloon. The readings from these devices would be sent to multiple ships and aircraft so nothing would need to be recovered after the explosion. After all the preparations were done and the balloon was inflated, the device was released and began to climb. The shock wave from Yucca reached the carrier 3 minutes and 16 seconds after detonation.

The Yucca test had many Department of Defense projects attached to it for research purposes. Alongside testing the use of a balloon carrier, the Department of Defense wanted to research the electromagnetic waves emitted from a nuclear explosion. This test would be used to determine the impact a nuclear explosion would have on electronic devices. All of the data from these Department of Defense projects would be stored on recording devices on surrounding islands and in aircraft so data would not have to be recovered after the test. However, Yucca was carrying five different transmitting devices in canisters to help with research. While the balloon proved to be a great success, no data from the canisters were able to be retrieved due to equipment issues onboard one of the aircraft carriers.

Teak 
Teak was the second high-altitude test after the success of Yucca. Instead of a balloon, the warhead for the Teak test would be carried by a Redstone missile; a modified Redstone missile had been used to launch Explorer I in January of the same year. Other nuclear weapons had been tested using the Redstone missile, but until this time the highest payload to have been detonated was  during Operation Teapot. Teak would be the first high-altitude test to have a payload in the megaton range. The test was scheduled to take place from the Bikini Atoll. Due to the fact that the payloads of Teak and Orange were much larger than previous high-altitude shots, the test was moved to Johnston Island as to protect nearby native islanders from any retinal damage. As both Teak and Orange had been relocated these two tests were named Operation Newsreel. The name Newsreel came from the fact that these two tests were being moved to Johnston Island.

The safety precautions taken by the teams involved were precisely detailed. The day before the launch 187 team members would evacuate Johnston Island with 727 men the day of the test. This was to keep as few men on the island while still being able to operate the airfield and critical data instruments. Another problem the team members were concerned about was the issue of retinal damage. Since the payload of the bomb was so large, aircraft were scheduled to keep any civilian ships out of a  radius of Johnston Island. Additionally, the Civil Aeronautics Authority was informed that it would be dangerous for any aircraft to fly within  of Johnston Island. On the day of the test only about 175 men remained on Johnston Island to prepare for Teak to be launched and other various duties needed after.

At 11:47 PM on July 31 Teak was launched; after 3 minutes it was detonated. Due to programming issues, the warhead detonated directly above Johnston Island. After the explosion, high frequency long-distance communication was interrupted across the Pacific. Due to this communication failure Johnston Island was unable to contact their superiors to advise of the test results until about eight hours after the detonation. Thirty minutes after detonation, a crew was sent out to collect the pod which had detached from the missile carrying the warhead. The pod had been irradiated and to handle it the crew members used disposable gloves in an attempt to protect themselves from beta radiation.

During the Teak test all crew on and around Johnston Island were given protective eyewear to prevent flash blindness from the explosion. A crew member who was on Johnston Island at the time was said to have received a slight sunburn from the amount of thermal radiation which had reached the island. While only slight to the crew member it created issues for the local fauna. Many birds were seen on Johnston Island in distress. Unsure if this was caused by blindness or thermal radiation, the project members decided to take precautions to protect local wildlife during the Orange test.

Orange 
Orange was launched twelve days after Teak on August 11, 1958. The same safety precautions used by Teak were implemented for the Orange launch. Along with protection for the project crew, it was decided after Teak that Sand Island, a local bird refuge, would need protection from the blast as well. To make sure that most of the wildlife was safe a smoke screen was created over Sand Island. Due to interest in Hawaii, it was announced on August 11 that there would be a nuclear test sometime between 10 PM and 6 AM.

The rocket carrying the warhead was launched at 11:27 from Johnston Island and traveled south. The recovery crew for the pod that was with Orange was unable to locate the research pod which had been launched with the rocket. Although Orange was visible from Hawaii it was not the great spectacle Teak had been. The light from the blast was visible for about 5 minutes. The explosion had also been slightly obscured to the crew at Johnston Island by cloud coverage. The blast from Orange did not cause the large communication interruption that Teak had caused, but some commercial flights to Hawaii were said to have lost contact with air traffic controllers for a short period of time.

Surface tests 
Of the 35 nuclear tests in Operation Hardtack I, four were surface burst shots: Cactus, Koa, Quince and Fig. These tests took place from May to August 1958, all at the Enewetak Atoll. Surface tests inherently present the potential for more radioactive exposure issues than the high-altitude or underwater detonations. This is because there is more material present to be converted to radioactive debris by excess neutrons due to the proximity to the Earth's surface, and due to the soil and other minerals excavated from the craters created by these blasts. The existence of this extra material allows for larger radioactive particles to be created and lifted into the blast cloud, falling back to the surface as fallout.Though surface and near-surface tests have a higher probability of radioactive exposure problems, the radioactive elements have significantly shorter residence times when injected into the atmosphere. During original concept planning in 1954, Enewetak was supposed to be the location of the smaller tests conducted during Operation Hardtack I. Due to poor weather conditions and policy changes in 1958, five of the UCRL tests which were planned to be conducted at the Bikini Atoll were moved to Enewetak. This included the later two surface blast devices in the Quince and Fig tests.

Cactus 

The Cactus test took place May 6, 1958 at approximately 0615. The nuclear fallout prediction map proved to be accurate in determining the span and the intensity of the resultant fallout.Measured peak intensity of fallout reached  at hour three directly above blast site on the North end of the Atoll. At mid-island the radiation was measured to be . The southern tip received a very small amount of radiation,  due to the easterly winds.

Out of the eight Programs listed, DOD-affiliated Projects 1.4, 1.7, 1.8, 1.9, 1.12, 2.8, 3.2, 5.2, 5.3, 6.4, 6.5 and 6.6 involved the Cactus test.

One of the goals of this test was to study the physical characteristics of the crater and the surrounding area pre- and post-detonation associated with Project 1.4. A camera was mounted to a RB-50 aircraft and the resultant crater was mapped using photogrammetry. Measurements were taken from  down to ground zero for both pre- and post detonation. Survey measurements of the Cactus test could not be made until the resultant radiation amounts had lowered to safer levels. Along with photogrammetric radial measurements, Airblast measurements were also recorded near surface zero for Cactus in accordance with Project 1.7. Similar to Project 1.8, Project 1.9 sought to determine transmission of blast pressure through the ground soil. Forty-three drums were buried at varying depths  from ground zero of the Cactus detonation. Individuals from the Air Force Ballistic Missile Division—TRW Space Technologies Laboratory sought to the Shock Spectra Studies of Project 1.12. Fallout measurements and samples were taken by aircraft in the aftermath of the detonation, as part of Project 2.8. These surveys were designed in part to determine the impact of specific radionuclides to overall nuclear fallout. Samples were taken early post-blast using a new rocket sampler, the UCRL, which were then followed by B-57D and WB-50 aircraft. Project 3.2 involved structural tests of corrugated steel arches. Eight days after the test, a crew of 13 men were allowed near the surface zero in order to extract the arch. The extraction took around twelve hours, and the radioactivity levels reached a maximum at  during this time. Project 5.2 sought to determine the effects of the blast on two A4D-1 aircraft, both in thermal radiation and pressure. Nine film badges were placed throughout each aircraft in order to measure radiation. There is not information available for the dosimeter worn by the pilot in aircraft 831. Information from the remaining three film badges, located at the Pilot's right leg, left sleeve, and left vest is not available. Project 5.3 was very similar to 5.2, focusing on the effects of the blast on the structure of two test FJ-4 aircraft. Though Cactus is mentioned in Project 6.5, whose goal was to study the radar echoes from the fireball, it is not clear what destroyers were involved if any. Destroyers for the Teak, Fir and Yucca tests are explicitly stated. Project 6.6, the lasts of the projects that involved the Cactus test, sought to measure the physical properties of the stabilized radioactive cloud following the blast.

Koa 
At 0630 on May 13, the Koa surface device was detonated at the western side of Dridrilbwij. The test was conducted in a large water tank. Nuclear fallout predictions for Koa were larger and covered a broader range than Cactus, with significantly higher radiation levels, an order of magnitude larger, in the immediate region surrounding the blast. There had been a larger nuclear barge detonation, the  Apache test, off the island of Dridrilbwij two years prior in 1956, during which the island survived. The detonation of the Koa device, however, caused complete destruction of the island.

The Department of Defense (DOD) sponsored a series of experiments for Koa: Projects 1.4, 1.7, 1.8, 1.9, 1.12, 2.9, 3.2, 3.6, 5.1, 5.3. 6.4, 6.5, 6.6, 6.9. and 6.11. Detailed measurements could not be made until four days after the blast due to radiation levels. Using a boat, the majority of the crater was mapped, though some measurements could not be made until 1959 due to radioactivity levels around the Koa blast site. The early radioactive cloud samples, normally collected post-shot as a part of Project 2.8 using a UCRL rocket sampler, were not collected after the Koa test due to technical difficulties. Fallout at high and low altitudes utilizing B-57D and WB-50 aircraft were measured with no technical problems. Project 3.6, which was conducted only on Koa, tested the effects of the blast on reinforced-concrete slabs buried close to surface zero. Project 5.2 was designed to measure the radiation levels using film badges on different areas of the aircraft and on the pilot directly. Koa had the lowest average radiation measurements of the eight shots on this project, with aircraft 827 ranging from 0.01-0.02R and aircraft 831 reporting levels between 0.03-0.19R. Unlike in the Cactus test, all nine film badges from both aircraft were successfully recovered and reported.

Quince and Fig 
Quince and Fig were a series of surface shots that occurred in early August at the center of Runit. They were the last of the Hardtack tests conducted at the Enewetak Atoll. Quince was detonated at 2:15pm on August 6, 1958. Twelve days later, the Fig device was detonated on August 18, 1958, at 4:00pm. Quince and Fig were UCRL devices with co-sponsorship through the DOD and the AEC, though the main focus of these tests was weapons development. One of the main differences between these two tests was that over 130 tons of soil from the Nevada Test Site had been shipped in and was placed at surface zero of the Fig test. As Runit was to also be the detonation site for Fig, the area had to be decontaminated after the Quince test. Around  of contaminated topsoil was removed from an area  upwind of ground zero. Even with these precautions, the measured alpha activity was around 20,000 counts per minute (CPM), and the area closest to surface zero was roped off to prevent personnel from entering. Thirty minutes post detonation, radiation measurements at the blast site reached over 10,000 R/hr.

The DOD experiments for Quince and Fig included Projects 1.4, 1.7. 2.4, 2.9, 2.10, 2.11, 2.14. and 8.7.

Barge tests 
Barge mounted test detonations was a technique first used in 1954, and also compensated for the lack of land at the HP. When testing returned to Bikini atoll the use of barges as the shot point had begun, with one notable advantage, no radioactive surface zero areas were developed. Two large underwater craters were formed in 1954 and these were used as subsequent surface zeros for detonations fired from barges. This allowed the available land area to be used for the placement of measurement instrumentation and reuse of the same burst point without the long delays required for radiological cooling by natural decay or expensive and long decontamination procedures. Reuse of zero points also allowed reuse of instrument locations and recording shelters for several tests saving construction costs and time and Increasing test-scheduling flexibility. In HARDTACK the 26 barge events used only five detonation areas.

Fir
Fır predicted fallout, surface radiological exclusion (radex) areas, ship position, and aircraft participation. FIR was the first Bikini detonation of the Hardtack series. Detonated at 0550 on May 12, 1958. Fır was detonated on a barge in the Bravo crater, producing a  yield range. The FIR detonation was shortly followed by BUTTERNUT detonation on Enewetak 25 minutes later. DOD-sponsored experiments for FIR included Projects 3.7, 5.1, 6.4, 6.5, 6.6 and 6.11.

Butternut
BUTTERNUT predicted fallout, surface radiological exclusion areas (radex), ship positions, and aircraft participation. Butternut was detonated at 0615 on May 12, 1958, 25 minutes after FIR had been detonated at Enewetak. The DOD-sponsored experiments for BUTTERNUT were Projects 5.1, 5.2, 5.3, 6.5, 6.6, and 6.9.

Holly
HOLLY predicted fallout, surface radiological exclusion (radex) areas, ship positions, and aircraft participation. HOLLY was detonated at 0630 on May 21, 1958, on a barge west of Runit,  from the nearest edge of the island, producing a  yield range. Project 6.6, was the only DOD-sponsored experiment for HOLLY, and was conducted on Enewetak Island.

Nutmeg
NUTMEG predicted fallout, surface radiological exclusion area (radex), ship positions, and aircraft participation. The second Bikini shot, NUTMEG, was detonated at 0920 on May 22, 1958. NUTMEG was detonated on a barge in the ZUNI crater, and produced a  yield range. DOD-sponsored experiments for NUTMEG were Projects 6.3, 6.3a, 6.4, 6.5, 6.6, and 6.11. Projects 6.3 and 6.3a had stations near the burst point on Eneman Island.

Yellowwood
YELLOWWOOD predicted fallout, surface radiological (radix) exclusion area, and ship positions. YELLOWWOOD was detonated at 1400 on May 26, 1958. The DOD sponsored 13 experiments for YELLOWWOOD: Projects 2.4, 2.8, 3.7, 5.1, 5.2, 5.3, 6.4, 6.5, 6.6, 6.8, 6.9, 6.11, and 8.1. Instrument stations for Project 2.4 were located on buoys in the lagoon. The remaining projects had more distant stations or were primarily airborne.

Magnolia
Predicted fallout, surface radiological exclusion (radix) area, ship positions, and aircraft participation. MAGNOLIA was detonated at 0600 on May 27, 1958. The DOD-sponsored experiments for MAGNOLIA were Projects: 3.7, 5.2, and 5.3. Instruments for Project 3.7 were on Boken, Enjebi, and Runit.

Tobacco
TOBACCO predicted fallout, surface radiological exclusion (radix) area, ship positions, and aircraft participation. TOBACCO was detonated at 1415 on May 30, 1958. The DOD-sponsored experiments for TOBACCO were Projects 3.7, 5.1, 5.2, 5.3, and 6.8. The project activity for Project 3.7 was on Boken, Enjebi, and Runit. Project 6.8 simply monitored TOBACCO from stations off Enewetak and Parry islands.

Sycamore
SYCAMORE predicted fallout, surface radiological exclusion (radex) area, ship positions, and aircraft participation. SYCAMORE was detonated at 1500 on May 31, 1958. SYCAMORE was detonated on a barge moored in the BRAVO crater, and produced a  yield range. DOD-sponsored experiments for SYCAMORE were Projects: 3.7, 5.1, 6.4, 6.5, 6.6, and 6.11. Only Project 6.11 had an instrument site at the Bikini Atoll.

Maple
MAPLE predicted fallout, surface radiological exclusion (radex) area, ship positions, and aircraft participation. MAPLE was detonated on June 11 at 0530 1958. MAPLE was detonated on a barge just south of Lomilik, and produced a  yield range. The  cloud produced by the detonation was tracked by radar from Benner. The DOD-sponsored experiments for MAPLE were Projects 5.1, 6.3, and 6.3a. Projects 6.3 and 6.3a shared the same, rather close-in sites on Lomilik.

Aspen
ASPEN predicted fallout, surface radiological exclusion (radex) areas, ship positions, and aircraft participation. ASPEN was detonated on 15 June 58 at 0530. ASPEN produced a  yield range. The detonation produced a  cloud as measured by radar from Benner. No experiments were sponsored by the DOD for this shot.

Walnut
WALNUT predicted fallout, surface radiological exclusion (radex) areas, ship positions, and aircraft participation. WALNUT was detonated on June 15, 1958, at 0630, 1 hour after the ASPEN event at Bikini. The detonation produced a  cloud, and produced a  yield range. The DOD-sponsored experiments for WALNUT included Projects 2.4, 2.8, 3.7, 5.1, 5.2, 5.3, and 8.1.

Linden
LINDEN predicted fallout, surface radiological exclusion (radex) area, ship positions, and aircraft participation. LINDEN was detonated on June 18, 1958, at 1500. The detonation produced a  cloud with a  base, and produced an  yield range. No DOD-sponsored experiments were conducted during LINDEN.

Redwood
REDWOOD predicted fallout, surface radiological exclusion (radex) areas, ship positions, and aircraft participation. REDWOOD was detonated on June 28, 1958, at 0530. REDWOOD was detonated on a barge south of Lomilik in Bikini. REDWOOD was followed by the ELDER detonation at Enewetak Atoll one hour later. The only DOD-sponsored experiment for REDWOOD was Project 5.1.

Elder
ELDER predicted fallout, surface radiological exclusion (radex) areas, ship positions, and aircraft participation. ELDER, detonated on June 28, 1958, at 0630. ELDER was the second of a tandem shot with REDWOOD (detonated an hour earlier on Bikini). The only DOD-sponsored experiment for ELDER was project 5.1.

Oak
OAK predicted fallout, surface radiological exclusion (radex) area, and ship positions. OAK, one of the largest detonations at Enewetak Atoll, and was fired at 0730 on June 29, 1958. It was followed at noon by the HICKORY shot at Bikini. The Initial height of the cloud was estimated to be , and produced an  yield range. Two DOD-sponsored experiments were included for OAK: Projects 2.8 and 5.1.

Hickory
HICKORY predicted fallout, surface radiological exclusion (radex) area, ship positions, and aircraft participation. HICKORY was detonated on June 29, 1958, at 1200. HICKORY was detonated on a barge off the west end of Enema at Bikini, 4½ hours after the OAK shot at Enewetak Atoll. Projects 6.3 and 6.3a were the only DOD-sponsored experiments for HICKORY.

Sequoia
SEQUOIA predicted fallout, surface radiological exclusion (radex) area, ship positions, and aircraft participation. SEQUOIA was detonated on July 2, 1958, at 0630. SEQUIA had no DOD-sponsored experiments.

Cedar
CEDAR predicted fallout, surface radiological exclusion (radex) area, ship positions, and aircraft participation. CEDAR was detonated on July 3, 1958, at 0530. CEDAR was detonated on a barge in the BRAVO crater southwest of Nam,  from the edge of the island at Bikini. The CEDAR detonation produced a  cloud, and produced a  yield range. The only DOD-sponsored experiment for CEDAR was Project 5.1.

Dogwood
DOGWOOD predicted fallout, surface radiological exclusion (radex) area, ship positions, and aircraft participation. DOGWOOD was detonated on July 6, 1958, at 0630. DOGWOOD was detonated on a barge southwest of Enjebi,  from the edge of the island at Enewetak. The only DOD-sponsored experiment for DOGWOOD Was Project 5.1.

Poplar
POPLAR predicted fallout, surface radiological exclusion (radex) area, ship positions, and aircraft participation. POPLAR was detonated on July 12, 1958, at 1530. POPLAR was detonated on a barge southwest of Nam, at Bikini. The only DOD-sponsored experiment for POPLAR was Project 3.7.

Scaevola
SCAEVOLA predicted fallout, surface radiological exclusion (radex) area, ship positions, and aircraft participation. Scaevola was detonated on July 14, 1958, at 1600. Scaevola was detonated on a barge west of Runit Island at Enewetak. Its yield was low and the explosion did not destroy the shot barge but only damaged it, producing a  yield range. No DOD-sponsored experiments were scheduled for Scaevola.

Pisonia
PISONIA predicted fallout, surface radiological exclusion (radex) area, ship positions, and aircraft participation. PISONIA was detonated on July 18, 1958, at 1100. No DOD-sponsored experiments were scheduled for PISONIA.

Juniper
JUNIPER predicted fallout, surface radiological exclusion (radex) area, ship positions, and aircraft participation. JUNIPER, the last nuclear detonation to occur at Bikini, was detonated on July 22, 1958, at 1620. JUNIPER was detonated on a barge  from the west end of Eneman in the ZUINI crater at Bikini . No DOD-sponsored experiments were scheduled for JUNIPER.

Olive
OLIVE predicted fallout, surface radiological exclusion (radex) area, ship positions, and aircraft participation. OLIVE was detonated on July 23, 1958, at 0830. OLIVE was detonated on a barge southwest of Enjebi Island, at Enewetak Atoll.  from the nearest land at Enewetak. No DOD-sponsored experiments were scheduled for OLIVE.

Pine
PINE predicted fallout, surface radiological exclusion (radex) area, ship positions, and aircraft participation. PINE was detonated on July 27, 1958, at 0830. PINE was detonated on a barge southwest of Enjebi Island,  from the nearest land, at Enewetak. No DOD-sponsored experiments were scheduled for PINE.

Underwater tests 
Underwater tests were conducted to assess the damages to Navy boats and materials. The location for these tests was Enewetak due to the uniformity of the sea bottom in the area. This is critical for the tests so that proper moorings of the target ships can be secured on the sea floor. The underwater explosions create a bubble from the expended energy of the blast. This bubble is due to the vaporization of water that directly absorbs the heat of the blast. This bubble may break the surface depending on how much energy is dispersed and the depth of the nuclear device. The bubble displaces large amounts of water that then collapses in on the bubble after all the energy is expended. The water collapsing in on the cavity is called the "radioactive pool" and has the highest concentration of radioactive material.

Many different projects were put in place to test the two underwater blasts. Wave generation, hydrodynamic variables, and energy released were all studied using multiple sensors. These sensors were placed in multiple areas such as target ships and floating balloons. Oceanographic, seismographic and hydrographic surveys were completed after each nuclear blast. A project that used a nuclear blast to clear minefields was studied using the Umbrella blast. These mines were then picked out of the water to study the effects of the blast at each interval.

Radiation preparations 
Another reason for underwater tests was to detect radiation contamination of ships after an underwater nuclear explosion. This meant that the contaminated ships required unique "radsafe" preparations so that the data could be quickly accounted for. After the data on the damage and radiation was recorded, the ships needed decontamination work completed before repairs could be completed. The Radiological and Decontamination Unit consisting of 200 enlisted and one officer was created for the task of decontamination. After decontamination, the target ships were repaired for use in a second underwater nuclear weapons test. The amount of radiation exposure was debated for the safety of the crews. Roentgens ( = ca 0,01 Gy in soft tissue) were used to gauge the gamma radiation that affected the units working on the nuclear tests.

These initial limits were rejected and maximum permissible exposure standards (MPE) were solidified by commanders for the crews working on the decontamination unit. Due to the fast recovery of ships, high contamination values were expected by commanders and set the standard to four roentgens per hour (R/hr). Personnel were given special breathing equipment to work in the interior of ships with an R/hr higher than one. High numbers of personnel working the tests were used to keep individuals within the MPE. Times were calculated to keep the total exposure below two roentgens for the personnel working on the ships. A floating decontamination facility was created on board a transport ship for the Wahoo and Umbrella nuclear tests. This allowed important data analysis and an increase in recovery efficiency.

Wahoo preparation 

The nuclear explosion was carried out in open ocean outside of Enewetak. This nuclear test codenamed Wahoo was the first underwater test in the Operation Hardtack series. Like its predecessor, the Wahoo shot was a scientific program that studied the effects of an underwater nuclear blast on Navy systems. This deep water test required precise targeting arrays to be set up around the blast location, which presented unique problems for the arrays as the winds, sea currents and tides needed to be within certain limits for the data to be accurate. Testing arrays were placed at depths of  around the nuclear device. The deep water mooring systems needed for the test proved to be difficult to position, leading many analysts to believe the data skewed. The target ships to be used for this program consisted of three destroyers, an active submarine, a submarine mockup used in Wigwam tests, and a merchant marine ship. It was predicted that no air blast or thermal effects would be presented from the underwater blast. The fallout from the blast was also predicted to stay within the target array due to the southwest surface winds.

Wahoo blast 
The test conditions were met on May 16 allowing for the nuclear device to be detonated. Within a second of detonation, a spray dome was created that reached a height of  after seven seconds. The overall shape of the spray dome resembled a cone with 45 degree sloped sides. Plumes were seen breaking through the spray dome after six seconds in every direction. The vertical plume continued rising until 12 seconds after the blast while the lateral plumes traveled for 20 seconds before collapsing. This base surge could be seen for three and a half minutes and for longer from the air as it continued to move across the ocean. The nuclear blast was calculated to be . One hour and ten minutes after detonation, a five-gallon water sample was taken directly above the blast location showing . The retrieval team entered a  field after an hour and thirty five minutes.

Umbrella preparation 
The second underwater explosion of the Operation Hardtack series was code-named Umbrella. This test was conducted in the lagoon inside Enewetak. This test could be considered a continuation of underwater test Baker, which was conducted in Bikini Lagoon. Explosions in shallow water can create an underwater crater if close enough to the bottom. The target ships from the Wahoo test were towed into the lagoon to be used again for the Umbrella test. The damage from Wahoo was minor in all cases with the exception of the Moran which required extra refurbishing of the hull. These ships had to be washed down and have the measuring equipment replaced before being put into use. The mooring for Umbrella was considerably easier than for Wahoo due to the location and depth of the lagoon. Information gathered from the Wahoo shot directly affected the Umbrella plans with regard to target array placement and decontamination times.

Umbrella blast 
June 9 saw the second underwater nuclear test of the Hardtack I series. The detonation occurred at 11:15 AM (local time) with clear skies and a  wind from the east-northeast. Within one-tenth of a second, the spray dome had broken through the surface. The overall shape of the spray dome resembled a vertical column with the plumes helping create the shape. Within 20 seconds of detonation, the maximum height of the column reached . This base surge could be seen from the air for about 25 minutes and the foam patch over the blast location lasting even longer. The blast yield of the nuclear device was measured to be . The maximum radiation reading was found to be  by an aircraft flying over the blast location. Radiation was reported to be of small portions, and re-entry was granted 30 minutes after detonation. After all scientific data had been gathered from the target ships, they were restored to be seaworthy and towed back to Pearl Harbor. The Moran was concluded to be unseaworthy due to the blast and was sunk by naval gunfire near Ikuren Island.

The underwater nuclear tests (Wahoo and Umbrella) gathered scientific data that helped the Department of Defense understand the effects of nuclear weapons on Navy ships. Some of the key points found were that underwater nuclear blasts create less fallout due to the absorption of radioactive material in the water and vaporized droplets. Direct gamma radiation was found to be extremely low, but the base surge was found to be highly radioactive as it passed measurement devices. Smaller radiation concentrations followed in waves mimicking the initial base surge. Almost all free-field radiation activity was found to disappear after fifteen minutes allowing for return to normal operations. The impact of shock waves was less than previously expected. The damage from the shockwave was found to be negligible on the destroyers at the ranges tested, but equipment failure from the blast could immobilize the ships. The preliminary tests of explosive tapered charges were proven to simulate the shock waves of a nuclear device according to the data gathered.

List of tests

References

External links

 
 
 
 
 Details of the YUCCA balloon-borne nuclear detonation published at Stratopedia, the balloon encyclopedia

Explosions in 1958
Hardtack I
Hardtack I
1958 in military history
1958 in the environment
1950s in the Marshall Islands
1958 in the Trust Territory of the Pacific Islands